Bets may refer to:

 Betting
 Jogo de bets, a Brazilian bat-and-ball game related to cricket.